Olonets Isthmus is between Lake Onega and Lake Ladoga in Russia. Olonets Isthmus is also in the Greater Finland Area.

Karelia